Lezgin , also called Lezgi or Lezgian, is a Northeast Caucasian language. It is spoken by the Lezgins, who live in southern Dagestan (Russia); northern Azerbaijan; and to a much lesser degree Turkmenistan; Uzbekistan; Kazakhstan; Turkey, and other countries. It is a much-written literary language and an official language of Dagestan. It is classified as "vulnerable" by UNESCO's Atlas of the World's Languages in Danger.

Geographic distribution 
In 2002, Lezgian was spoken by about 397,000 people in Russia, mainly Southern Dagestan; in 1999 it was spoken by 178,400 people in mainly the Qusar, Quba, Qabala, Oghuz, Ismailli and Khachmaz (Xaçmaz) provinces of northeastern Azerbaijan. Lezgian is also spoken in Kazakhstan, Kyrgyzstan, Turkey, Turkmenistan, Ukraine, Germany and Uzbekistan by immigrants from Azerbaijan and Dagestan.

Some speakers are in the Balikesir, Yalova, Izmir, Bursa regions of Turkey especially in Kirne (Ortaca), a village in Balikesir Province which touches the western coast, being south-west of Istanbul.

The total number of speakers is about 800,000.

Related languages

Nine languages survive in the Lezgic language family:
 Lezgin
 Tabasaran
 Rutul
 Aghul
 Tsakhur
 Budukh
 Kryts
 Udi
 Archi

These have the same names as their ethnic groups.

Some dialects differ heavily from the standard form, including the Quba and Akhty dialects spoken in Azerbaijan.

Phonology

Vowels

  is very often rounded after labialized consonants, which may then lose their labialization.
  is open in stressed syllables
 if a vowel plus  sequence is not followed by a vowel, the  may be deleted and the vowel nasalized. Thus  ('I') can be pronounced .
 In the environment of labialized consonants /e/ is often pronounced as [ø~œ].

Consonants
There are 54 consonants in Lezgian. Characters to the right are the letters of the Lezgian Cyrillic Alphabet. Note that aspiration is not normally indicated in the orthography, despite the fact that it is phonemic.

Alphabets 

Lezgian has been written in several different alphabets over the course of its history.  These alphabets have been based on three scripts: Arabic (before 1928), Latin (1928–38), and Cyrillic (1938–present).

The Lezgian Cyrillic alphabet is as follows:

The Latin alphabet was as follows:

Grammar
Lezgian is unusual for a Northeast Caucasian language in not having noun classes (also called "grammatical gender"). Standard Lezgian grammar features 18 grammatical cases, produced by agglutinating suffixes, of which 12 are still used in spoken conversation.

Cases
The four grammatical cases are:
 Absolutive case (basic form of the word, no ending): marks the subject of an intransitive verb and the direct object of a transitive sentence. It is also used to mark a nominal predicate (who or what something turns into/becomes) and as a vocative.
 Ergative case (various endings; the most common are: -ди, -a or -е; [-di, -a or e], which are added to the Absolutive): marks the subject of transitive verbs, and the subject of some compound intransitive verbs.
 Genitive case (ending -н [-n]; added to the Ergative): marks possession. It is also used with the meaning 'of'. The genitive case precedes the noun that it modifies.
 Dative case (ending -з [-z]; added to the Ergative): usually marks the indirect object of sentences, that is the recipient of an action. It is also used to mark the subject of some verbs (mainly about emotions) and to express a point of time and direction.
 There are fourteen Locative cases:
 Adessive case (ending -в [-v]; added to the Ergative): marks the object of some verbs to mean 'by', 'to', 'with'.
 Adelative case (ending -вай [-vaj]; added to the Ergative): expresses movement from somewhere. It is also used with the verb 'to be able' and to express an accidental action.
 Addirective case (ending -вди [-vdi]; added to the Ergative): used as an instrumental case, but also sometimes used with its original meaning, 'in the direction of', and more rarely 'near by'.
 The Postessive case (ending -хъ [-qh]; added to the Ergative): means 'behind', 'at', 'toward', 'in exchange for', and 'with.' In a construction with the verb ава (ava), it expresses possession.
 Postelative case (ending -хъай [-qhaj]; added to the Ergative): can either mean 'from' or the cause of fear or shame.
 Postdirective case (ending -хъди [-qhdi]; added to the Ergative): rarely used case, meaning 'toward(s)'.
 Subessive case (ending -к [-k]; added to the Ergative): means either 'below' or 'participates'.
 Subelative case (ending -кай [-kaj]; added to the Ergative): means either 'from below', 'from', '(from) against', 'with' or 'out of' (partitive). It is also used to mark Y in the construction 'X becomes out-of-Y' and can express the topic of a sentence ('about') or the cause of emotions.
 Subdirective case (ending -кди [-kdi]; added to the Ergative): expresses cause (never motion under), and can mean 'because' or 'of' (when in sentences such as 'the man died of a disease'.
 Inessive case (endings -а or -е [-a or -e]; added to Absolutive): means 'at', 'in' or 'during/whilst'.
 Inelative case (endings -ай or -ей [-aj or -ej]; added to Inessive): means 'out of' or 'in return for'.
 Superessive case (ending -л [-l]; added to the Inessive): means 'on', and also to express the cause of some emotions.
 Superelative case (ending -лай [-laj]; added to the Inessive): means 'off', 'after' or 'than' (comparison).
 Superdirective case (ending -лди [-ldi]; added to the Inessive): means 'onto', 'until', 'in' (when followed by an adjective), as an instrumental case (e.g. language) or instructive with abstract nouns.

Declension
There are two types of declensions.

First declension

Vocabulary

Numbers
The numbers of Lezgian are:

Nouns following a number are always in the singular. Numbers precede the noun. "Сад" and "кьвед" lose their final "-д" before a noun.

Lezgian numerals work in a similar fashion to the French ones, and are based on the vigesimal system in which "20", not "10", is the base number. "Twenty" in Lezgian is "къад", and higher numbers are formed by adding the suffix -ни to the word (which becomes "къанни" - the same change occurs in пудкъад and кьудкъад) and putting the remaining number afterwards. This way 24 for instance is къанни кьуд ("20 and 4"), and 37 is къанни цӏерид ("20 and 17"). Numbers over 40 are formed similarly (яхцӏур becomes яхцӏурни). 60 and 80 are treated likewise. For numbers over 100 just put a number of hundreds, then (if need be) the word with a suffix, then the remaining number. 659 is thus ругуд вишни яхцӏурни цӏекӏуьд. The same procedure follows for 1000. 1989 is агьзурни кӏуьд вишни кьудкъанни кӏуьд in Lezgi.

References

Bibliography

External links

 Lezgi-Englich online dictionary
 Appendix:Cyrillic script
 Notes on the Lezgi language
 Languages of the World report
 Lezgian basic lexicon at the Global Lexicostatistical Database
 Lezgian Dictionary + Mobile apps

Northeast Caucasian languages
Lezgins
Languages of Azerbaijan
Languages of Russia
Languages of Georgia (country)
Languages of Kazakhstan
Languages of Uzbekistan
Languages of Turkey
Languages of Turkmenistan
Languages of Ukraine
Languages of Kyrgyzstan
Lezgian languages
Vulnerable languages